Freeway 1 is a freeway in northern Iran, connecting the cities of Qazvin and Rasht within Gilan Province. 

This freeway is part of the Iranian North-South Corridor system. 

It starts from Freeway 2, crosses through the Alborz mountain range, and ends near Rasht. It runs along Road 49.

Route

1
Transportation in Gilan Province
Alborz (mountain range)